Tom Taylor (born 10 February 1985) is an English footballer.

Career

Professional
Taylor came up through the ranks in the youth academies of English clubs Walsall and Derby County, but made his professional debut in Norway at the age of 19 after being signed by Viking FK manager Roy Hodgson.

After brief spells at Grimsby Town, Walsall and a one-month loan at non-League side Halesowen Town in England, Taylor moved to the United States to play with the Portland Timbers of the USL First Division in 2007.

Moving back to the UK, Taylor was signed by Wrexham manager Brian Little in August 2008, but only saw limited action in the Wrexham squad as the club struggled in the Conference National.

Taylor was announced as a Real Maryland Monarchs player on 10 February 2009, scoring in his first game for the Monarchs, and helping the Monarchs reach the play-offs for the first time in their history.

Taylor signed for Wilmington Hammerheads in February 2011, his most recent club to date.

References

External links
Real Maryland Monarchs bio

1985 births
Living people
English footballers
Portland Timbers (2001–2010) players
Walsall F.C. players
Viking FK players
Grimsby Town F.C. players
Wrexham A.F.C. players
Halesowen Town F.C. players
Real Maryland F.C. players
Wilmington Hammerheads FC players
USL First Division players
USL Second Division players
USL Championship players
Association football midfielders
English expatriate footballers
English expatriate sportspeople in the United States
Expatriate soccer players in the United States
English expatriate sportspeople in Norway
Expatriate footballers in Norway